The president of the Republic of Botswana is the head of state and the head of government of Botswana, as well as the commander-in-chief of the armed forces, according to the Constitution of Botswana.

The president is elected to a five-year term that runs concurrently with the term of the National Assembly. Since 1997, he has been limited to a total of 10 years in office (equivalent to two full terms), whether successive or separated. For example, if current president Mokgweetsi Masisi were to leave office in 2024, he could run again in 2029, but would have to leave office for good in 2034. The president is elected via a form of double simultaneous vote. All candidates for the National Assembly declare whom they endorse for president when they lodge their nomination papers, and the candidate who receives a majority of endorsements from the elected members of the National Assembly is automatically elected. If no candidate receives a majority of endorsements, the National Assembly elects the president by simple majority, before it co-opts the specially elected members. If no president is elected after three ballots, or if the Speaker determines that no candidate has enough support to be elected, the legislature is automatically dissolved. In practice, the president is the leader of the majority party in the Assembly.

Presidents of Botswana (1966–present) 
Political parties

Symbols

 Died in office

Lifespan timeline of presidents of Botswana
This is a graphical lifespan timeline of presidents of Botswana.  The presidents are listed in order of office.

<div style="overflow:auto">

Footnotes

See also

Botswana
Politics of Botswana
First Lady of Botswana
List of commissioners of Bechuanaland
List of heads of government of Botswana
Vice-President of Botswana
Lists of incumbents

References
World Statesmen - Botswana

b
 
Presidents
1966 establishments in Botswana